Mooncoin GAA is a Gaelic Athletic Association club located in the village of Mooncoin, County Kilkenny, Ireland. The club was founded in 1886 and fields teams in both hurling and Gaelic football.

Honours
 Kilkenny Senior Club Hurling Championship (12):  1888, 1900, 1906, 1908, 1913, 1916, 1927, 1928, 1929, 1932, 1936, 1965
 Kilkenny Senior Club Football Championship (1): 1986
 Kilkenny Intermediate Hurling Championship (2): 1990, 1994
 All-Ireland Junior Club Hurling Championship (1): 2022 (runners-up 2017)
 Leinster Junior Club Hurling Championship (2) 2016, 2022
 Kilkenny Junior Hurling Championship (7): 1908 (as Suirside Rovers), 1920, 1937, 1942, 1961, 2016, 2021
 Kilkenny Minor Hurling Championship (8): 1933, 1958, 1960, 1961, 1962, 1964, 1979, 2018
 Kilkenny Under-21 Hurling Championship (2): 1983, 2010

References

External links
 Mooncoin GAA site

Gaelic games clubs in County Kilkenny
Hurling clubs in County Kilkenny
Gaelic football clubs in County Kilkenny